Denise Brown  is a Canadian Senior UN official and the current Head of the United Nations in Ukraine. She was appointed to this position on 28 July 2022. Prior to this appointment, she served as Deputy Special Representative of the Secretary-General (DSRSG), Humanitarian Coordinator and Resident Coordinator in the Central African Republic.

Ms. Brown has held different leadership positions for the UN in the fields of humanitarian coordination, peacekeeping, emergency preparedness, and regional coordination, in both headquarters and field locations. Her work has covered Afghanistan, Cambodia, Central African Republic, Haiti, Iraq, Kenya, Niger, and Somalia. She also served in headquarters and regional offices in Dakar, Rome, and New York.

Career 
She began her career in the with non-governmental organizations in Cambodia and Haiti, working in the social sector.

World Food Programme

Denise Brown joined the UN’s World Food Programme in the late 1990s, serving in Iraq (1998-1999), Afghanistan (1999-2002), Kenya (2002-2007), and Somalia (2007-2009), during which she led discussions on humanitarian access with state and non-state actors, including Al Shabab in Somalia.

From 2009-2011 she served as a Senior Liaison Officer with WFP in New York, and then, from 2013-2016, as WFP's Regional Director for West and Central Africa, based in Dakar, covering 20 countries.

From 2016-2019, she worked at World Food Programme (WFP) headquarters in Rome, first as Director of the Emergency Preparedness and then as Director of Policy and Programmes.

UN Peacekeeping

From April 2019 to July 2022, Ms. Brown served as Deputy Special Representative for the United Nations Multidimensional Integrated Stabilization Mission in the Central African Republic (MINUSCA), and as United Nations Resident Coordinator and Humanitarian Coordinator, where she reinforced the linkages between the peace and security, development, and humanitarian actions of the UN. In CAR, Ms. Brown led the coordination of both the UN’s COVID-19 response and the UN’s integrated electoral assistance for the 2020-21 presidential and legislative elections

Education 
Denise Brown is a graduate of the University of British Columbia and holds a Master’s of Science in Children’s Development from Purdue University.

References 

World Food Programme people
1963 births
Canadian officials of the United Nations
Living people
People from Vancouver
Date of birth missing (living people)
University of British Columbia alumni
Purdue University alumni